Hashcat is a password recovery tool. It had a proprietary code base until 2015, but was then released as open source software. Versions are available for Linux, OS X, and Windows. Examples of hashcat-supported hashing algorithms are LM hashes, MD4, MD5, SHA-family and Unix Crypt formats as well as algorithms used in MySQL and Cisco PIX.

Hashcat has been publicly noticed because of its optimizations; partly based on flaws in other software discovered by the creator of hashcat. An example was a flaw in 1Password's password manager hashing scheme. It has also been compared to similar software in a Usenix publication and been described on Ars technica.

Variants 
Previously, two variants of hashcat existed:
 hashcat - CPU-based password recovery tool
 oclHashcat/cudaHashcat - GPU-accelerated tool (OpenCL or CUDA)

With the release of hashcat v3.00, the GPU and CPU tools were merged into a single tool called hashcat. The CPU-only version became hashcat-legacy. Both CPU and GPU now require OpenCL.

Many of the algorithms supported by hashcat-legacy (such as MD5, SHA1, and others) can be cracked in a shorter time with the GPU-based hashcat. However, not all algorithms can be accelerated by GPUs. Bcrypt is an example of this. Due to factors such as data-dependent branching, serialization, and memory (and more), oclHashcat/cudaHashcat weren't catchall replacements for hashcat-legacy.

hashcat-legacy is available for Linux, OSX and Windows.
hashcat is available for macOS, Windows, and Linux with GPU, CPU and generic OpenCL support which allows for FPGAs and other accelerator cards.

Sample output 
$ hashcat -d 2 -a 0 -m 400 -O -w 4 example400.hash example.dict

hashcat (v5.1.0) starting...

OpenCL Platform #1: Intel(R) Corporation
========================================
* Device #1: Intel(R) Core(TM) i5-2500K CPU @ 3.30GHz, skipped.

OpenCL Platform #2: NVIDIA Corporation
======================================
* Device #2: GeForce GTX 970, 1010/4041 MB allocatable, 13MCU
* Device #3: GeForce GTX 750 Ti, skipped.

Hashes: 1 digests; 1 unique digests, 1 unique salts
Bitmaps: 16 bits, 65536 entries, 0x0000ffff mask, 262144 bytes, 5/13 rotates
Rules: 1

Applicable optimizers:
* Optimized-Kernel
* Zero-Byte
* Single-Hash
* Single-Salt

Minimum password length supported by kernel: 0
Maximum password length supported by kernel: 55

Watchdog: Temperature abort trigger set to 90c

Dictionary cache hit:
* Filename..: example.dict
* Passwords.: 128416
* Bytes.....: 1069601
* Keyspace..: 128416

The wordlist or mask that you are using is too small.
This means that hashcat cannot use the full parallel power of your device(s).
Unless you supply more work, your cracking speed will drop.
For tips on supplying more work, see: https://hashcat.net/faq/morework

Approaching final keyspace - workload adjusted.

$H$9y5boZ2wsUlgl2tI6b5PrRoADzYfXD1:hash234       
                                                 
Session..........: hashcat
Status...........: Cracked
Hash.Type........: phpass, WordPress (MD5), phpBB3 (MD5), Joomla (MD5)
Hash.Target......: $H$9y5boZ2wsUlgl2tI6b5PrRoADzYfXD1
Time.Started.....: Thu Apr 25 05:10:35 2019 (0 secs)
Time.Estimated...: Thu Apr 25 05:10:35 2019 (0 secs)
Guess.Base.......: File (example.dict)
Guess.Queue......: 1/1 (100.00%)
Speed.#2.........:  2654.9 kH/s (22.24ms) @ Accel:128 Loops:1024 Thr:1024 Vec:1
Recovered........: 1/1 (100.00%) Digests, 1/1 (100.00%) Salts
Progress.........: 128416/128416 (100.00%)
Rejected.........: 0/128416 (0.00%)
Restore.Point....: 0/128416 (0.00%)
Restore.Sub.#2...: Salt:0 Amplifier:0-1 Iteration:1024-2048
Candidates.#2....: 0 -> zzzzzzzzzzz
Hardware.Mon.#2..: Temp: 44c Fan: 40% Util: 50% Core:1265MHz Mem:3004MHz Bus:8

Started: Thu Apr 25 05:10:32 2019
Stopped: Thu Apr 25 05:10:37 2019

Attack types 
Hashcat offers multiple attack modes for obtaining effective and complex coverage over a hash's keyspace. These modes are:
 Brute-force attack
 Combinator attack
 Dictionary attack
 Fingerprint attack
 Hybrid attack
 Mask attack
 Permutation attack
 Rule-based attack
 Table-Lookup attack (CPU only)
 Toggle-Case attack
 PRINCE attack (in CPU version 0.48 and higher only)

The traditional bruteforce attack is considered outdated, and the Hashcat core team recommends the Mask-Attack as a full replacement.

Competitions 
Team Hashcat (the official team of the Hashcat software composed of core Hashcat members) won first place in the KoreLogic "Crack Me If you Can" Competitions at DefCon in 2010, 2012, 2014, 2015, and 2018, and at DerbyCon in 2017.

See also 

Brute-force attack
Brute-force search
Hacker (computer security)
Hacking tool
Openwall Project
Password cracking

References

External links

A guide to password cracking with Hashcat 
Talk: Confessions of a crypto cluster operator based on oclHashcat at Derbycon 2015
Talk: Hashcat state of the union at Derbycon 2016

Password cracking software
Free security software
Formerly proprietary software